The 2019 Northern Iowa Panthers football team represented the University of Northern Iowa in the 2019 NCAA Division I FCS football season. The team was led by Mark Farley in his 19th season and played their home games in the UNI-Dome in Cedar Falls, Iowa as a member of the Missouri Valley Football Conference. They finished the season 10–5, 6–2 in MVFC play to finish in second place. They received an at-large bid to the FCS Playoffs where they defeated San Diego and South Dakota State to advance to the quarterfinals where they lost to James Madison.

Previous season

They finished the 2018 season 7–6, 5–3 in MVFC play to finish in a tie for third place. They received an at-large bid to the FCS Playoffs, where they defeated Lamar in the first round before losing to UC Davis in the second round.

Preseason

MVFC poll
In the MVFC preseason poll released on July 29, 2019, the Panthers were predicted to finish in fifth place.

Preseason All–MVFC team
The Panthers had three players selected to the preseason all-MVFC team.

Offense

Briley Moore – TE

Jackson Scott-Brown – OL

Defense

Xavior Williams – DB

Schedule

Game summaries

at Iowa State

Southern Utah

Idaho State

at Weber State

Youngstown State

at North Dakota State

South Dakota

at Missouri State

at Illinois State

Indiana State

at South Dakota State

Western Illinois

FCS Playoffs
The Panthers were selected for the postseason tournament, with a first-round pairing against San Diego.

San Diego–First Round

at South Dakota State–Second Round

at James Madison–Quarterfinals

Ranking movements

References

Northern Iowa
Northern Iowa Panthers football seasons
Northern Iowa
Northern Iowa Panthers football